János Pócs (born November 17, 1963) is a Hungarian politician, member of the National Assembly (MP) for Jászapáti (Jász-Nagykun-Szolnok County Constituency II) from 2010 to 2014, and for Jászberény (Jász-Nagykun-Szolnok County Constituency II) since 2014.

He was elected member of the Committee on Agriculture on May 14, 2010. He served as the mayor of Jászapáti between October 2010 and 2014. He functioned as one of the recorders of the National Assembly from May 6, 2014 to June 2, 2014.

He made international news in December 2017 when he posted a photo on his Facebook page showing people standing over a slain and charred pig, with "Ő VOLT A SOROS!!!" inscribed on the animal. The inscription can be translated as "He was next in line" or "He was Soros." He commented on the photo the following: "One pig less over there." He denied that the inscription had anything to do with George Soros. The Open Society Foundations described the photo as a "shocking attack" and "another example of officially accepted anti-Semitism in Viktor Orbán's Hungary." The Hungarian government has previously launched a political campaign against the Hungarian-American businessman.

References

1963 births
Living people
Mayors of places in Hungary
Fidesz politicians
Members of the National Assembly of Hungary (2010–2014)
Members of the National Assembly of Hungary (2014–2018)
Members of the National Assembly of Hungary (2018–2022)
Members of the National Assembly of Hungary (2022–2026)
People from Jászapáti